The 1963–64 Danish 1. division season was the seventh season of ice hockey in Denmark. Five teams participated in the league, and KSF Copenhagen won the championship.

Regular season

External links
Season on eliteprospects.com

Danish
1963 in Danish sport
1964 in Danish sport